The original Baptist Memorial Hospital (also known as  Old Baptist Memorial Hospital) was a 2,000-bed medical facility and complex of three hospital buildings located on 899 Madison Avenue in the vicinity of midtown Memphis, Tennessee. The facility closed in 2000, and was demolished in 2005 after 88 years of service. When Baptist transferred their main ownership to the Baptist Memorial Hospital-Memphis (Formerly known as Baptist East) in eastern Memphis. It was once the world's largest privately owned hospital.

History and construction
The 7-story 150-bed Baptist Memorial Hospital in midtown Memphis originally opened on July 22, 1912, and since then was expanded over the years to form what was the largest privately owned hospital in the United States by the mid 20th century. The idea for the hospital was formed at a Shelby County Baptist Association meeting in 1906 when Dr. H.P. Hurt of the Bellevue Baptist Church proposed a new Baptist-sponsored hospital.

In 1914, the hospital was in debt and near closure due to a lack of patients.

The hospitals superintendent A.E. Jennings raised $1 million to save the hospital.
It was the first hospital to have a hotel for patients, and an office building for doctors.
A.E. Jennings retired as superintendent in 1946 and Dr. Frank Groner became the hospitals new superintendent in 1946.

By the 1970s, Baptist continued to grow. The Shelby County Demographic Center shifted, Baptist East, a satellite hospital, was built in 1979. In 1980, Joseph Powell succeeded Frank Groner as the CEO and administrator, and Baptist began expanding its branches of hospitals across the mid-southern United States.

In 1994, Joseph Powell retired as CEO and president and Stephen C. Reynolds took over as the new 4th CEO and president of Baptist.

Physicians & Surgeons Building
The Physicians & Surgeons Building (shortened to P&S building) was one of the original buildings, a 110-foot 9-story low-rise building located on 893-909 Madison Avenue. The building was originally constructed in 1919 as an addition for the Baptist Memorial Hospital, but went through several phases until its completion in 1937, and another addition in 1946. Its architecture was of neo-classical design.

Baptist Memorial Hospital main building
The main building was a 255-foot tall, 924,000 square foot, 1,400-bed, 21-story X-shaped hospital building located on 899 Madison Avenue in the eastern part of the complex. Constructed as an expansion on behalf of the Baptist Memorial Hospital, Medical Center in midtown Memphis. Other alternative names for the building included the Union East Addition, Baptist Memorial Hospital, and University of Tennessee Medical Center.

The construction for the 13-story Y-shaped Madison East portion of the building started in 1953, and was completed in 1956 as part of an expansion of the Baptist Memorial Hospital complex in the 1950s. By the early 1960s, the hospital was in need of another expansion. It purchased the land, where Russwood Park, a professional baseball park and stadium, was located prior to being destroyed by a fire on Easter Sunday, April 17, 1960. The 19-story Union East portion was later expanded in 1967, forming the buildings X-shape.

The main building was where Elvis Presley was pronounced dead on August 16, 1977.

Closure & demolition

After decades of expansions of Baptist hospitals across the mid-southern United States, new technology and a number of reduced patients. On November 17, 2000, the old Baptist Memorial Hospital closed and transferred its last 14 patients to other facilities, marking its 88 years of service.

After closing the campus, the Baptist Memorial Hospital gave away land to the University of Tennessee Health Science Center.

When the facility closed in 2000, the main building stood vacant for the next 5 years.

Demolition of the Baptist Memorial Hospital facility began in 2005. Prior to the main buildings demolition, the Research Laboratory and Physicians & Surgeons Building were both imploded on May 8, 2005. The main building was demolished via controlled implosion on November 6, 2005, at 6:45 AM by Chandler Demolition and Controlled Demolition, Inc. to make room for a biomedical research park.

Notable birth
Lisa Marie Presley

See also
Medical District, Memphis
Baptist Memorial Hospital-Memphis
List of hospitals in Tennessee

References

External links
Display Location: Baptist Memorial Hospital (Downtown) - Urban Exploration Resource

Landmark and Legend: Baptist Hospital, Medical Center
Historic Memphis Hospitals - and Medical Centers
Baptist Centennial Documentary

1912 establishments in Tennessee
2000 disestablishments in Tennessee
Hospital buildings completed in 1937
Hospital buildings completed in 1967
Buildings and structures demolished in 2005
Buildings and structures demolished by controlled implosion
Hospitals in Memphis, Tennessee